Frank Joseph Auffret (born 23 December 1950) is a British former motorcycle speedway rider.

Born in Middlesbrough, Auffret entered the sport via cycle speedway, and after winning the Tyneside Cycle Speedway Championship in 1967 he took up the motorized form of the sport. He first rode in second half races at Middlesbrough Teessiders in 1969 and made his league debut in 1970 for Hackney Hawks in Division One, riding in two heats but failing to score, also riding for Rayleigh Rockets. He established himself in the Teesside team in the Second Division in 1971, and his average improved to 8.62 in 1973. He was selected for the Young England team in 1972 and 1973. In 1973 he also rode in the top division for Leicester Lions and Halifax Dukes, and he signed for Leicester in 1974, averaging almost 6.5 in Division One. He stayed with Leicester in 1975. He represented the full England team in 1974 and 1975. In 1976 he moved on to Hull Vikings, riding for them for six seasons until their closure in 1981. He made three appearances for Middlesbrough Tigers in 1982 before retiring from the sport.

After his speedway career, Auffret gained a diploma in Management Studies and Marketing from Teesside University and worked in local government before becoming a website designer.

References

1950 births
Living people
British speedway riders
English motorcycle racers
Sportspeople from Middlesbrough
Hackney Hawks riders
Leicester Lions riders
Halifax Dukes riders
Hull Vikings riders
Middlesbrough Bears riders